Swift River is the name of a Yukon town and several rivers:

Canada
Swift River (Cottonwood River), British Columbia
Swift River (Teslin Lake), British Columbia

Jamaica
Swift River (Jamaica)

New Zealand
Swift River, New Zealand

United Kingdom
River Swift, a tributary of the River Avon (Warwickshire)

United States
Swift River (Alaska)
Swift River (Bearcamp River), a tributary of the Bearcamp River, New Hampshire
Swift River (Maine), a tributary of the Androscoggin River
Swift River (Minnesota)
Swift River (Saco River), a tributary of the Saco River, New Hampshire
Swift River (Ware River), a tributary of the Ware River, Massachusetts
Swift River (Westfield River), a tributary of the Westfield River, Massachusetts

Other 
 SwiftRiver (software)